Chiaroscuro is a comic series developed by Canadian artist Troy Little between 2000 and 2005.

Publication history
Little began self-publishing in 2001 and after releasing two issue he received a Xeric in 2001 which allowed him to produce another five issues. Personal circumstances slowed progress until he was given a second grant from the P.E.I. Council of the Arts in 2005 which allowed him to finish and release the last three issue. In 2007 the series was collected into a single volume by IDW Publishing. In July 2008 IDW also gave out a free preview comic featuring Chiaroscuro and Little's next project Angora Napkin.

Plot
The story is about an unemployed artist named Steven Patch, who leads a depressing life of drinking and complaining about his life. He eventually runs into a situation of mistaken identity, which sends him into a spiraling series of life-altering decisions.

Reception
It has been praised by independent comics legend Dave Sim

Collected editions
It has been collected into a single volume:
 Chiaroscuro (234 pages, B&W hardcover, IDW Publishing, 2007)

References

External links
 Chiaroscuro #1-7 review, May 2003, by Greg McElhatton at ReadAboutComics.com

2001 comics debuts